"Bite My Tongue" is the second single from You Me at Six's third studio album Sinners Never Sleep, released on 4 December 2011 as a digital download in the United Kingdom. The single reached number 124 on the UK Singles Chart and number 4 on the UK Rock & Metal Singles Chart. The song features guest vocals from Oliver Sykes of Bring Me the Horizon.

Music video
A music video to accompany the release of "Bite My Tongue" was first released onto YouTube on 6 November 2011 with a total length of three minutes and forty-five seconds.

Track listing

Promotional CD

Chart performance

Release history

References

2011 singles
You Me at Six songs
2011 songs
Songs written by Josh Franceschi
Virgin Records singles
Polydor Records singles